The 2019 season of the Tonga Major League is the 40th season of top flight association football competition in Tonga. The winner qualifies for the 2020 OFC Champions League Qualifying stage. Because the Tonga Major League is the only men's senior competition on Tonga there is no relegation. Many league games take place at the 1,500-capacity Loto-Tonga Soka Centre.

Teams
Fahefa
Ha'amoko United Youth
Lavengatonga
Longoteme
Lotoha'apai United
Marist FC
Navutoka
Veitongo

Stadiums

League table
Note: Information on goals for and against not available.

References

Tonga Major League seasons
Tonga
1